Burangulovo (Buranğol) is a rural locality (a selo) and the administrative center of Burangulovsky Selsoviet, Abzelilovsky District, Bashkortostan, Russia. The population was 773 as of 2010. There are 8  streets.

Geography 
Burangulovo is located 40 km northwest of Askarovo (the district's administrative centre) by road. Iskakovo is the nearest rural locality.

References 

Rural localities in Abzelilovsky District